Preach Brother! is an album by American saxophonist Don Wilkerson recorded in 1962 and released on the Blue Note label.

Reception

The Allmusic review by Stephen Thomas Erlewine awarded the album 4 stars and stated "The result is another fine record that proves Wilkerson was one of the best, hardest-hitting soul-jazz saxophonists of the early '60s".

Track listing
All compositions by Don Wilkerson
 "Jeanie-Weenie" - 5:01
 "Homesick Blues" - 6:40
 "Dem Tambourines" - 5:38
 "Camp Meetin'" - 4:44
 "The Eldorado Shuffle" - 6:28
 "Pigeon Peas" - 8:35

Personnel
Don Wilkerson - tenor saxophone, tambourine
Sonny Clark - piano
Grant Green - guitar
Butch Warren - bass
Billy Higgins - drums
Jual Curtis - tambourine (tracks 3-4)

References

Blue Note Records albums
Don Wilkerson albums
1962 albums
Albums produced by Alfred Lion
Albums recorded at Van Gelder Studio